Samandağ (as-Sūwaydīyah), formerly known as Süveydiye, is a town and district in Hatay Province of southern Turkey, at the mouth of the Asi River on the Mediterranean coast, near Turkey's border with Syria,  from the city of Antakya. In February 2023, the town was heavily damaged by powerful earthquakes.

Etymology
Samandağ was formerly known as Süveydiye, Yukarı Alevışık and Levşiye. It was officially named Samandağ (Seman Dağ, Turkish for Jabal Sem'an: St. Symeon Mountain) in 1948. In Armenian, it was known as Svetia.

History
Samandağ lies near the site of the ancient Seleucia Pieria, founded in 300 BC after the Persian Empire was ousted from the region by Seleucus Nicator, a general of Alexander the Great, in the Seleucid era that followed Alexander's demise. Seleucia Pieria quickly became a major Mediterranean port of the Hellenistic and Roman eras, the port of Antioch. However, it was subject to silting and an earthquake in 526 finally completed its demise as a port.

During the 6th century, Saint Simeon Stylites the Younger lived on Saman Dağı, a nearby mountain that is also known in Christian sources as the "Wondrous Mountain" or the "Admirable Mountain."

Samandağ, then called St Symeon, became the port of Antioch. The area was conquered by the Rashidun Caliphate in 637 after the Battle of the Iron Bridge and later it came under the control of the Umayyad and Abbasid Arab dynasties. It was then reconquered by the Byzantines under Nikephoros II Phokas but later conquered by the Seljuk Turks under general Afşin Bey after the Battle of Manzikert which resulted in a disastrous defeat for the Byzantines. It played an important role in the capture of the city by the Crusaders in 1098, to be known as Soudin. The whole area was known as Svediye, where six villages of Armenians were located (Bityas, Kabousiye, Haji Habibly, Kheder Beg, Yoghoun Olouk and Vakif) until 1939, the so called "Referendum", when all the Armenian villagers (over 6000) emigrated to Anjar, Lebanon. Only a small part of Vakif remained and are still in the village, now called Vakifly.

Geography 
Samandağ itself is a small town of 35,000 people, close to the city of Antakya.  The local economy depends on fishing and agriculture, especially citrus fruits, and Samandağ has the air of a country market town, with young men buzzing through the streets on mopeds. Around the midtown of Çevlik (derived from Seleucia), there is a long sandy coastline popular with daytrippers from Antakya, although the sea can be stormy.  This is an important nesting area of the endangered sea turtle Caretta caretta.

Population 

The vast majority of the population is composed of Arabic speakers who adhere to the Alawism and/or Nusayrism.  There are also Sunni Arabs and Turks. There are Armenian and Antiochian Greek Orthodox Christian communities in the district, with around 2,000 people. The village of Vakıflı is Turkey's only remaining rural Armenian community.

Local politics
Politically Samandağ is traditionally left-leaning. In the 2009 local elections, Freedom and Solidarity Party (ÖDP) candidate Mithat Nehir was elected mayor of the ilçe with 34.20% of the votes (the CHP candidate got 31.77%, the AKP one 14.07%) he was then the sole victorious ÖDP candidate in the entire republic. In September 2013, he joined the CHP under which banner he successfully contested the next 2014 local elections. In the local elections in March 2019 Refik Eryılmaz was elected Mayor for the Republican People's Party (CHP). The current District Governor is Murat Kütük.

Places of interest 

 The tunnel of Vespasian-Titus, in the village of Kapısuyu , built as a water channel in the 2nd century. 
 The tomb of the Muslim saint Hızır.
 Vakıflı, the only remaining Armenian village in Turkey.
 Monastery of Simeon Stylites the Younger

See also
Latakia

References

External links 

 All About of Samandag
 Governorship of Samandag
 photo album of Samandağ
 info on Seleucia Pieria 
 Seleucia Pieria

Populated places in Hatay Province
Populated coastal places in Turkey
Districts of Hatay Province
Mountains associated with Byzantine monasticism